The 1985 FIFA U-16 World Championship, the first edition of the tournament, was held in the cities of Beijing, Shanghai, Tianjin, and Dalian in People's Republic of China from July 31, 1985, to August 11, 1985. Players born after August 1, 1968, can participate in this tournament. The total attendance for the tournament was a record 1,230,976 but in 2017 India U-17 World cup surpassed this with a record attendance of 1,347,133.

Venues

Qualified Teams

Squads

For full squad lists for the 1985 U-16 World Championship see 1985 FIFA U-16 World Championship squads.

Referees

Asia
  Fallaj Al-Shanar
  Chen Shengcai
  Cui Baoyin
  Zhang Daqiao
  Hassan Abdullah Al Mullah
Africa
  Simon Bantsimba
  Karim Camara
  Alhati Salahudeen
CONCACAF
  Carlos Alfaro
  Angelo Bratsis
  Joaquin Urrea Reyes

South America
  Arnaldo Cézar Coelho
  Carlos Espósito
  Juan Ortube
Europe
  Miklós Nagy
  Claudio Pieri
  Karl-Heinz Tritschler
Oceania
  Chris Bambridge

Group stages

Group A

Group B

Group C

Group D

Knockout stages

Quarterfinals

Semifinals

Third place play-off

Final

Result

Goalscorers

Marcel Witeczek of West Germany won the Golden Shoe award for scoring eight goals. In total, 91 goals were scored by 56 different players, with only one of them credited as own goal.

8 goals
 Marcel Witeczek
5 goals
 William
4 goals
 Billa Momoh
3 goals
 Bismarck Barreto Faria
 Guo Zhuang
 Victor Igbinoba
 Abdulaziz Al Razgan
2 goals

 Hugo Maradona
 Paul Trimboli
 Mauricio
 Xie Yuxin
 Herve Kakou
 Mohamed Soumah
 Mohamed Sylla
 Salifou Koita
 László Marik
 Zoltán Kanál
 Giorgio Bresciani
 Elias Ledesma
 Boushal Al Boushal
 Curtis Pride

1 goal

 Diego Álvarez
 Fernando Cáceres
 Lorenzo Frutos
 Craig Naven
 Stan Thodis
 Erwin Sánchez
 Marco Etcheverry
 Andre Cruz
 Marques
 Natalino Rodrigues Antunes
 Cao Xiandong
 Sun Bowei
 Tu Shengqiao
 Eric Mantot
 Etienne Salles
 Hernán Medford
 Lamine Toure
 Zsolt Huszák
 Andrea Caverzan
 Francisco Cortes
 Fatai Atere
 Jonathan Akpoborie
 Joseph Babatunde
 Adel Al Abdulla
 Saleh Al Mohannadi
 Adel Al Dosary
 Nasser Al Fahad
 Saadoun Al Suraiti
 Larry McPhail
 Detlev Dammeier
 Dirk Konerding
 Helmut Gabriel
 Klaus Mirwald

Own goal
 Bi Sheng (playing against West Germany)

Final ranking

References

External links
FIFA U-16 World Championship China PR 1985, FIFA.com
FIFA Technical Report (Part 1) and (Part 2)

FIFA U-16 World Championship
International association football competitions hosted by China
Fifa U-16 World Championship, 1985
FIFA U-17 World Cup tournaments
FIFA U-16 World Championship
FIFA U-16 World Championship